Zoltán Pető (born 19 September 1974) is a Hungarian former professional footballer who played as a defender for Debreceni VSC, K.F.C. Verbroedering Geel, Újpest FC, MTK Hungária FC, FC Brussels, MFC Sopron, Kayserispor and the Hungary national team.

Clubs 
He started his career in Debrecen, staying for eight seasons and winning a domestic cup; in 2000 he moved to Belgium to Verbroedering Geel.

External links

cms.proximedia.com 

1974 births
Living people
People from Szolnok
Sportspeople from Jász-Nagykun-Szolnok County
Hungarian footballers
Association football defenders
Hungary international footballers
Hungary under-21 international footballers
Olympic footballers of Hungary
Footballers at the 1996 Summer Olympics
Nemzeti Bajnokság I players
Süper Lig players
Belgian Pro League players
Újpest FC players
MTK Budapest FC players
Debreceni VSC players
R.W.D.M. Brussels F.C. players
Szolnoki MÁV FC footballers
Hungarian expatriate footballers
Hungarian expatriate sportspeople in Turkey
Expatriate footballers in Turkey
Hungarian expatriate sportspeople in Belgium
Expatriate footballers in Belgium
Place of birth missing (living people)